Resnik may refer to:

Places

Bosnia and Herzegovina
 Resnik (Hadžići), a village near Sarajevo
 Resnik (Višegrad), a village near Višegrad

Croatia
 Resnik, Požega-Slavonia County, a village in eastern Croatia
 Resnik Bosiljevski, a village near Bosiljevo, Karlovac County
 Resnik, a former settlement now part of Peščenica – Žitnjak, City of Zagreb
 Resnik, a section of Kaštela that is the location of the Split Airport

Montenegro
 Resnik, Montenegro, near Bijelo Polje

Serbia
 Resnik, Belgrade, an urban neighborhood of Belgrade, Serbia
 FK Resnik, football club from Resnik
 Resnik, Kragujevac, a village near Kragujevac
 Resnik, Babušnica, a village near Pirot
 Resnik (Sokobanja), a village near Sokobanja

Slovenia
 Resnik, Zreče, a village in the Municipality of Zreče, northeastern Slovenia

Other
 Resnik (crater), a lunar crater southwest of McAuliffe
 3356 Resnik, an asteroid
 Resnik (surname)

See also
 Resnick (surname)